Allenstown House was a large five-bay, four-story Georgian mansion in County Meath, Ireland. It was built in around 1750 by William Waller.

The final owner was Vice-Admiral Arthur William Craig who assumed the surname Craig-Waller when he inherited the property in 1920 from a distant relative. In the late 1930s the house and estate were bought by the Irish Land Commission. The lands were broken up and sold. The house, though of architectural and historical significance, was controversially demolished in 1938.

References

See also
Ardbraccan
Ardbraccan House
Bohermeen
Durhamstown Castle

Country houses in Ireland
Houses in County Meath
Buildings and structures demolished in 1938